David A. Pizarro is an American psychologist and podcaster. He is a Professor of Psychology at Cornell University. He is also the Chief Science Officer of BEworks, a behavioral economics consulting firm, and is the co-host of the Very Bad Wizards Podcast. His research focuses on the psychological underpinnings of human morality, as well as on the influence of emotions on decision-making, particularly on the emotion of disgust. Pizarro has made appearances on several radio and television documentaries to discuss his work.

Early life and education
Pizarro graduated with a Bachelor’s degree from Pacific Union College in 1997 and received his Ph.D in social psychology from Yale University in 2002 (under the supervision of Peter Salovey and Paul Bloom).

Career
After receiving his PhD, Pizarro became a post-doctoral fellow at the University of California, Irvine. Since 2006, Pizarro has been a professor in the department of psychology at Cornell University.

Pizarro’s research focuses on broadening the understanding regarding the nature of human morality—especially on how humans arrive at moral judgments about people and actions (such as judgments of character, responsibility, blame, and praise), and in how emotions (especially disgust) influence moral judgments. In his 2012 TED talk, The Strange Politics of Disgust, he provided an overview of his working linking individual differences in the degree to which people are easily disgusted to differences in political orientation. Pizarro was interviewed about his work on disgust by Richard Dawkins for his documentary Sex, Death and the Meaning of Life.

Since 2012, Pizarro has been co-host of the podcast Very Bad Wizards, along with the philosopher Tamler Sommers, from the University of Houston.

Awards and recognition
Pizarro was the Nannerl Keohane Distinguished Visiting Professor, University of North Carolina at Chapel Hill and Duke University in 2014. In 2021 he was the recipient of the Stephen and Margery Russell Distinguished Teaching Award from Cornell University in 2021. He is a Fellow of the Association for Psychological Science.

Bibliography

References

External links
Very Bad Wizards
Peez Is My Name

Living people
21st-century American psychologists
Cornell University faculty
Year of birth missing (living people)